Richard Joseph Blackwell (July 31, 1929 - October 10, 2021) was an American philosopher and professor emeritus of philosophy at Saint Louis University, where he held the Danforth Chair in the Humanities. His research has been on the interactions between modern science and philosophy.

His PhD thesis (1954) was on Aristotle, under the supervision of Leonard Eslick.

In 1999, the journal The Modern Schoolman published an issue in his honor.

Selected publications
Galileo, Bellarmine, and the Bible (University of Notre Dame Press; 1991) According to Google Scholar, it has been cited 200 times.
Translation of Tommaso Campanella's A Defense of Galileo (University of Notre Dame Press; 1994)

References

1929 births
2021 deaths
Philosophy academics
20th-century American philosophers
People from Cleveland